Cucurak is a typical tradition originating from Sundanese culture, especially in the Bogor Regency and Bogor City areas. Cucurak is an integral part of welcoming Ramadan. From generation to generation, this tradition has been maintained by the Sundanese people in Bogor to this day.

"Cucurak" or "curak-curak" comes from Bogor Sundanese dialect which means 'having fun'. In the tradition, cucurak is done by gathering with extended family or colleagues.

See also
Sundanese culture

References

Bogor
Bogor Regency
Sundanese culture
Ceremonial food and drink